Peter Mullen (born 11 January 1942) is a British Church of England priest. He is the former Rector of St Michael, Cornhill and St Sepulchre-without-Newgate in the City of London. Mullen is Chaplain to the Honourable Company of Air Pilots, one of the Livery Companies of the City of London and the Anglican Chaplain to the London Stock Exchange, a largely honorific and historical post.

Life and career

Mullen graduated from the University of Liverpool with the degree of BA, before obtaining a PhD from Middlesex University.

He was ordained into the Church of England in 1970. He became Chaplain and Head of Religious Education (RE) at Whitecroft School, Bolton in 1974. In 1977 he was appointed Vicar of Tockwith and Bilton-in-Ainsty with Bickerton, Diocese of York, where he remained until 1989.  He was censured in 1989 by the Church of England for committing adultery with a parishioner, and as a consequence had to resign from his incumbency in Yorkshire. From 1989 to 1997 he was banned from performing priestly duties. Mullen has written an article on his adultery.

He became Rector of St Michael's Cornhill and St Sepulchre-without-Newgate, and Chaplain to the Stock Exchange in 1998.  He was made to retire, against his will, on his seventieth birthday in January 2012, but he remains chaplain to the Freedom Association.

Views

Mullen is noted for his criticism of homosexuality. Writing on his online blog, he stated that homosexuals should carry health warnings, for instance, "Sodomy may seriously damage your health". He later explained that his comments were 'satirical', and went further by saying that he has homosexual friends. Nonetheless, a spokesman for the Diocese of London made an announcement distancing the Bishop and fellow clergy from Mullen's statements, following which these comments were removed from his blog. He later apologised. Mullen has also called for tax-payer funded homosexual parades to be banned, describing them as "obscene".

Mullen is Eurosceptic and in March 2010, he spoke at a United Kingdom Independence Party event in Chichester, where he denounced the European Union and Islam. He has mocked Muslims, saying there could be an "agreeable carnage" at the start of the annual Hajj in Mecca: "They usually manage to stampede and slaughter quite a few hundred of their co-religionists. Just imagine for a moment what a field day the BBC and the left-wing press in England would have if anything even remotely as bad as that happened in Vatican Square at Christmas or Easter". He added that Muslims "lend themselves to ridicule: sticking their arses in the air five times a day. How about a few little choruses, 'Randy Muslims when they die/Find 70 virgins in the sky'?"

Mullen is a frequent contributor to the Wall Street Journal. He has also written for the Daily Telegraph  in support of preserving traditional forms of Anglican worship. Mullen has argued it should be permissible to use force against a burglar, even that resulting in death, and that burglars forfeit all their rights by their actions.

References

External links
St Michael's Cornhill website
Daily Telegraph website

1942 births
Living people
Journalists from Liverpool
Alumni of the University of Liverpool
Alumni of Middlesex University
20th-century English Anglican priests
21st-century English Anglican priests
Members of the Freedom Association
Christian critics of Islam
British critics of Islam